Robert "Puiu" Cosmoc (1931 – 11 December 1997) was a Romanian professional footballer who played as a midfielder for Flacăra Ploiești and Jiul Petroșani. After retirement, Cosmoc was a respectable football manager, managing for years in the Divizia A and obtaining notable results with clubs such as: Farul Constanța, Bihor Oradea, Progresul Brăila, CSM Suceava or Rapid București. Cosmoc was also the assistant manager of the Romania national football team in the tenure of Valentin Stănescu.

Former CSM Suceava player, Relu Buliga, described Cosmoc in an interview given in 2017:"Nea Puiu Cosmoc was a calm guy with a strong voice and a style based on the long diagonal pass".

Honours

Player
Flacăra Ploiești
Divizia B: 1954
Cupa României: Runner-up 1952

Jiul Petroșani
Divizia B: 1960–61

Manager
Știința Cluj
Cupa României: 1965–66

CSM Suceava
Divizia B: 1986–87

References

External links
Robert Cosmoc (player) at labtof.ro
Robert Cosmoc (manager) at labtof.ro

1931 births
1997 deaths
Romanian footballers
Association football midfielders
Liga I players
Liga II players
FC Petrolul Ploiești players
CSM Jiul Petroșani players
Romanian football managers
CS Universitatea Craiova managers
FCV Farul Constanța managers
FC Bihor Oradea managers
AFC Dacia Unirea Brăila managers
FC Progresul București managers
FC Politehnica Timișoara managers
CS Corvinul Hunedoara managers
FC Rapid București managers